Roots Rock Riot is the second album from Welsh rock band Skindred. It was released on 23 October 2007 in the United States.

Background
The album was produced by Matt Squire and mixed by Rick Will (who also mixed Skindred's debut album Babylon). The album sold 3,200 copies the first week of its release in the US.

Track listing
 "Roots Rock Riot" — 3:02
 "Trouble" — 3:49
 "Ratrace" — 3:22
 "State of Emergency" — 4:03
 "Alright" — 3:09
 "Destroy the Dancefloor" — 3:44
 "Rude Boy for Life" — 4:11
 "Killing Me" — 4:19
 "Spit Out the Poison" — 3:47
 "Cause Ah Riot" — 3:05
 "Ease Up" — 4:00
 "Choices and Decisions" — 4:39

iTunes bonus track:
13. "Days Like These" — 3:42

Japanese bonus track:
14. "It's a Crime" - 3:18

Personnel
Skindred
Clive "Benji" Webbe – vocals
Michael John "Mikeydemus" Fry – guitar
Daniel Pugsley – bass, electronics
Arya "Dirty Arya" Goggin – drums

Production
Produced by Matt Squire
Engineered by Jordan Schmidt and Matt LaPlant
Mixed by Rick «Soldier» Will
Mastered by Michael Fuller, at Fuller Sound, Miami, Florida
Trumpet by Ryan Muir
Trombone by Andrew Borstein
Violin by Emilia Mettenbrink
Viola by Chris Fischer
Cello by Naomi Gray
A&R by Jason and Aaron Bieler
Art conception by Michael Fry
Art direction and design by Tim Fox
Photo by Jason Reposar

References

2007 albums
Skindred albums
Bieler Bros. Records albums
Albums produced by Matt Squire